Néjia Ben Mabrouk (born 1 July 1949) is a Tunisian screenwriter and director, known for her work on the award-winning film Sama and on the documentary The Gulf War... What Next?.

Early life and education
Ben Mabrouk was born at El Oudiane, Tunisia, in 1949 and attended boarding school at Sfax. At a young age, she became familiar with European cinema and joined the local film club. Concerning her career plans growing up, she explains:

During her college years, Ben Mabrouk first studied French at Tunis University, but had to leave after a few semesters for financial reasons. She began studying filmmaking at INSAS in 1972 at Brussels. Her film education was largely built on critical documentary film. She wrote and directed the film At Your Service for her graduation project in 1976, and then worked as a trainee for RTBF.

Career
From 1979 to 1980, Ben Mabrouk started writing the script for her first full-length feature, Sama (The Trace). The film was finished in 1982, but a dispute with the production company SATPEC delayed the film's release until 1988. Sama won the Caligari Prize at the 1989 Berlin International Film Festival. Sama contains autobiographical elements from Ben Mabrouk's life, and tells the story of a young Tunisian girl seeking an education, which she eventually finds exiled in Europe.

She wrote and directed a fifteen-minute segment titled "In Search of Chaima" for the documentary The Gulf War... What Next? (1991), investigating the impact of war on women and children. She has written the screenplay for her second full-length feature, titled Nuit à Tunis (Night in Tunis).

References

External links 
 

1949 births
Living people
Tunisian screenwriters
Tunisian women film directors
Tunisian film directors
Tunis University alumni
Women screenwriters
20th-century screenwriters
20th-century Tunisian writers
20th-century Tunisian women writers
21st-century screenwriters
21st-century Tunisian writers
21st-century Tunisian women writers